Chub Lake is a lake in Twin Lakes Township, Carlton County, Minnesota, United States. On its North end is Chub Lake Park with its beach and a state owned public boat access. The DNR's information on the lake says that its primary fish species are walleye and largemouth bass.

External links

Lake information report

Lakes of Carlton County, Minnesota
Lakes of Minnesota
Tourist attractions in Carlton County, Minnesota